Calumet is an unincorporated community in Mississippi County, Arkansas, United States. Calumet is located at the junction of Arkansas highways 151 and 181 on the northeast border of Gosnell.

References

Unincorporated communities in Mississippi County, Arkansas
Unincorporated communities in Arkansas